Michael M. E. Johns (born 1942) is an American physician. He is a professor in both public health and medicine at E. He is emeritus executive vice president for health affairs at Emory as well as emeritus president, CEO, and chairman of the board of Emory Healthcare. He also served as Emory University's fifth chancellor.

Education
Johns received his B.S. degree in biology from Wayne State University in 1964. He received a Doctor of Medicine degree from University of Michigan in 1969 and was elected to the Alpha Omega Alpha honor society. He completed his internship and residency training at University of Michigan in otolaryngology in 1975.

Career
Johns was a member of the U.S. Army Medical Corps and served as assistant chief of otolaryngology at Walter Reed Army Medical Center from 1975 to 1977. He joined the department of otolaryngology and maxillofacial surgery at University of Virginia School of Medicine in 1977. Johns joined Johns Hopkins University School of Medicine in 1984 to be professor and chair of the department of otolaryngology-head and neck surgery. He later served as associate dean for clinical practice at Johns Hopkins and became dean of the medical faculty and vice president for medicine at Johns Hopkins in 1990.

Johns joined Emory University in 1996 to be executive vice president for health affairs and to lead the Robert W. Woodruff Health Sciences Center. He led health sciences at Emory until 2007, when he became chancellor of Emory University, serving until 2012. Johns served as interim head of Michican Medicine (formerly the University of Michigan Health System) in 2014 and as interim head of Emory's Woodruff Health Sciences Center in 2015.

References 

1942 births
Wayne State University alumni
20th-century American physicians
21st-century American physicians
University of Michigan Medical School alumni
Emory University faculty
Living people
United States Army Medical Corps officers
Johns Hopkins University faculty
Fellows of the American Association for the Advancement of Science